Nathan Davis (May 22, 1917 – October 15, 2008) was an American film and television actor. He was featured in Holes, Chain Reaction, Flowers in the Attic, Stony Island.

Life and career
Davis was born in Chicago, Illinois, the son of Romanian-Jewish immigrants, Rose (née Marcus) and Fred Davis. He served in Europe during World War II and performed on the local stage and in radio productions after the war. Davis was also a pharmaceutical sales rep by trade but pursued acting after being fired from his sales job in the late '70s.

Davis started acting in the late 1970s. He appeared on Mister Rogers' Neighborhood in 1975 and in films such as Dunston Checks In, Holes, Code of Silence, Chain Reaction, Thief, Poltergeist III, and many others. He was nominated for a 1980 Joseph Jefferson Award for Actor in a Principal Role in a Play for his performance in Buried Child at the Northlight Theatre in Chicago, Illinois. He was again nominated for a Joseph Jefferson Award for Actor in a Principal Role in a Play for The Sunshine Boys at the National Jewish Theater in Chicago, Illinois in 1991. He was nominated for the last time for a 2001 Joseph Jefferson Award for Actor in a Principal Role in a Play for 2 1/2 Jews at the Apple Tree Theatre in Chicago, Illinois.

He was married to Metta (née Talmy). They had three children: Chicago musician Richard "Richie" Peter Davis, Hollywood film director Andrew Davis, and Jo Ellen Davis Friedman.

Davis died from emphysema and complications of pneumonia in Chicago at age 91.

Filmography

Film

Television

References

External links

1917 births
2008 deaths
American male film actors
American male television actors
American people of Romanian-Jewish descent
Deaths from emphysema
Deaths from pneumonia in Illinois
Male actors from Chicago
20th-century American male actors
21st-century American male actors